Sunnydale High Yearbook is a tie-in book based on the United States television series Buffy the Vampire Slayer. In the series, the closing shot of the episode "Graduation Day, Part Two" shows the fictional yearbook this tie-in was modeled after.

Plot summary
The Scooby Gang are coming to the end of their Senior year at High School, Buffy Summers is busy making battle plans. Willow has time to pick up the High School Yearbook for her. Once the gang could relax knowing that high school truly was over, Xander, Oz, Cordelia, Giles, Angel and others scrawled notes in Buffy's yearbook to make it special. It is now full of notes, photos and in-jokes only the Scoobies understand and appreciate, having fought on the Hellmouth for three years and survived High School.

This book was an oddity in the release of Buffy publications by Pocket Books, it was neither a novelization of an episode, nor an original novel, but instead a fictional school yearbook. It featured "inscriptions" from characters on the front inside cover; Willow, Xander, Oz, Giles, Cordelia, Angel, Anya, Wesley, Snyder, Joyce, Jonathan, Harmony, Larry, and Devon. It also included inscriptions from the crew-folk on the back inside cover. In the "In Memoriam" section Willow mentions Harmony's absence but she doesn't know Harmony is dead until "The Harsh Light of Day".

1999 books
Books based on Buffy the Vampire Slayer
Yearbooks